Superset may refer to:

Superset in mathematics and set theory
SuperSet Software, a group of friends who later became part of the early Novell
Superset (strength training), for supersets in strength training
Apache Superset, a data exploration and visualization web application